Rodney County was one of the counties of New Zealand in the North Island, from 1876 until 1989. It came into existence in November 1876, when the provinces were abolished. In the 1989 local government reforms, it merged with Helensville Borough to create Rodney District.

List of county chairmen
The Rodney County Council was presided over by a chairman. The following is a complete list of officeholders:

See also 
 List of former territorial authorities in New Zealand § Counties

Notes

References
 
 

Counties of New Zealand
Politics of the Auckland Region
Former subdivisions of the Auckland Region